Eric Wright (born August 31, 1980) is a Liberian footballer (defender) playing currently for Invincible Eleven. He is also a member of the Liberia national football team.

External links 

1980 births
Living people
Liberian footballers
Association football defenders
Invincible Eleven players
Liberia international footballers